Devil, officially stylized as dEVIL, is a Japanese remake of the Korean suspense drama series titled The Devil which aired on KBS 2TV in 2007. The drama stars Satoshi Ohno of Arashi and Toma Ikuta, both under the talent agency Johnny & Associates.

Synopsis
Ryo Naruse (Satoshi Ohno) is a two-faced lawyer: on the surface, he is a kind-hearted soul, representing the poor and earning the nickname "The Angel Lawyer" from the press; but unbeknownst to anyone else, he is also a "devil," meticulously plotting the perfect revenge against those responsible for his younger brother's death. Naoto Serizawa (Toma Ikuta) is a gung-ho detective whose overzealous methods mask a dark past which he is trying to overcome. When a family acquaintance of Serizawa's is murdered, Serizawa is thrust in the middle of a multiple-homicide case which stirs up memories of a dark event from his past.

Opening theme song
The theme song for this series is "Truth" by Arashi, a popular Japanese boy band which Satoshi Ohno is the leader of. In a preview of "Truth" promotional video on TBS morning entertainment news program 2jichaō, Ohno explains that the meaning of the song is very close to the content and feel of the whole drama. Arashi displayed their dancing in the promotional video of "Truth" with Ohno as the lead. It was revealed in Maō's official blog (written by the staffs / producers and posted at their official site) Ohno diligently practiced the intricate dance move in between takes because of his busy schedule.

Cast

Primary cast 
Satoshi Ohno as Ryo Naruse
Toma Ikuta as Naoto Serizawa
Ryoko Kobayashi as Shiori Sakita
Kei Tanaka as Hitoshi Kasai
Shugo Oshinari as Mitsuru Souda
Tomohiro Waki as Yosuke Ishimoto
Misa Uehara as Kaoru Takatsuka
Mai Shinohara as Eri Nishina
Yutaka Shimizu as Keita Yamano
Kisuke Iida as Kanrikan Ishihara
Toshihide Tonesaku as Takashi Kurata
Michiko Kichise as Mari Serizawa
Hitori Gekidan as Noriyoshi Serizawa
Yuji Miyake as Hiromichi Nakanishi
Koji Ishizaka as Eisaku Serizawa

Secondary cast
Hiroki Kouno as young Toomo Manaka
Toshi Takeuchi as Hideo Manaka
Haruki Kimura as young Naoto Serizawa
Kayano Masuyama as young Shiori Sakita
Yuto Uemura as young Hitoshi Kasai
Haruo Honma as young Mitsuru Souda
Ryunoshin Nakamura as young Yosuke Ishimoto

Guest appearances
Kazunari Ninomiya as Masayoshi Kumada (episode 1)
Mayumi Asaka as Yoshimi Manaka (episodes 1, 2, 4)
Tetsuo Morishita as Takahiro Kumada (episodes 1, 2)
Kitaro as Kunio Hayashi (episodes 1, 2)
Kaoru Okunuki as Tae Shintani (episodes 2–4)
Momoka Oono as Sora Shintani (episodes 2–5, 7)
Naomasa Musaka as Takahiro Ikehata (episodes 4–7)
Yūka as Makiko Naruse (episodes 4–7)
Outa Tanino as the real Ryo Naruse (episode 5)
Kyusaku Shimada as Oosumi Kazuma (episodes 5–7, 9)

Episodes

Awards

References

External links
Official website  
Weekly ratings 

2008 Japanese television series debuts
2008 Japanese television series endings
Kin'yō Dorama
Japanese television series based on South Korean television series
Live-action shows scored by Hiroyuki Sawano